Lost in Translation is a 2003 comedy-drama film written and directed by Sofia Coppola. The film focuses on the relationship between a washed-up movie star, Bob Harris (Bill Murray), and a recent college graduate in an unhappy marriage, Charlotte (Scarlett Johansson), over the course of one week in Tokyo. The film also features Giovanni Ribisi and Anna Faris in supporting roles. The film featured an original score by Kevin Shields and Brian Reitzell and cinematography by Lance Acord; it was edited by Sarah Flack. Lost in Translation premiered at the Telluride Film Festival in 2003. Focus Features gave the film a limited release on September 12, 2003, before a wide release on October 3. It grossed a worldwide total of over $119 million on a production budget of $4 million. Review aggregator Rotten Tomatoes surveyed 222 reviews and judged 95% of them to be positive.

Lost in Translation received awards and nominations in a variety of categories, particularly for Coppola's direction and screenwriting as well as the lead acting performances from Murray and Johansson. At the 76th Academy Awards, it won Best Original Screenplay (Coppola) and the film received three further nominations—Best Picture, Best Director (Coppola), and Best Actor (Murray). The film garnered three Golden Globe Awards from five nominations; Best Motion Picture – Musical or Comedy, Best Actor – Motion Picture Musical or Comedy, and Best Screenplay. At the 57th British Academy Film Awards, Lost in Translation won three awards; Best Actor in a Leading Role, Best Actress in a Leading Role (Johansson), and Best Editing.

Lost in Translation also received awards from various foreign award ceremonies, film festivals, and critics' organizations. Among others, the film won Best American Film at the Bodil Awards, Best Foreign Film at the César Awards, and Best Foreign Film at the Film Critics Circle of Australia, French Syndicate of Cinema Critics, and Deutscher Filmpreis as well as the Nastro d'Argento for Best Foreign Director. The film also won the Independent Spirit Award for Best Film, Best Film – Comedy or Musical at the Satellite Awards, and two prizes at the Venice International Film Festival. In terms of critics' organizations, Lost in Translation received awards in the Best Film category from the San Francisco Film Critics Circle, the Toronto Film Critics Association, and the Vancouver Film Critics Circle.

Accolades

See also 
 2003 in film

Notes

References

External links
 

Lists of accolades by film